The Ambassador Extraordinary and Plenipotentiary of the Russian Federation to the Commonwealth of Australia is the official representative of the President and the Government of the Russian Federation to the Prime Minister and the Government of Australia.

The ambassador and his staff work at large in the Embassy of Russia in Canberra. There is a consulate-general in Sydney. The ambassador of Russia to Australia is concurrently accredited to Fiji, Nauru, Tuvalu and Vanuatu.

History of diplomatic relations

Contact between Australia and the Russian Empire began in the 1800s with the visit of the Neva to Sydney, then part of the British-administered Colony of New South Wales. Consular relations began in 1857. Diplomatic relations between the Soviet Union and the Commonwealth of Australia were formally established on 10 October 1942. The first envoy, was appointed on 13 October 1942. Representation was upgraded to the exchange of ambassadors after 1948. On 4 April 1954 the ambassador, was recalled to Moscow in the wake of the Petrov Affair. Diplomatic representation was thereafter suspended until 3 March 1959, when an agreement was made to exchange ambassadors. Ivan Kurdyukov was appointed on 23 June 1959, and presented his credentials on 10 August 1959. With the dissolution of the Soviet Union in 1991, the Soviet ambassador, Vyacheslav Dolgov, continued as representative of the Russian Federation until 1993.

List of representatives (1942 – present)

Representatives of the Soviet Union to the Commonwealth of Australia (1942 – 1991)

Representatives of the Russian Federation to the Commonwealth of Australia (1991 – present)

See also 

 List of Australian ambassadors to Russia
 Embassy of Australia, Moscow
 Foreign relations of Australia
 Ambassadors of Russia

References

External links

Ambassadors of Russia to Australia
Australia
Russia